Kwon Ri-se (August 16, 1991 – September 7, 2014), better known by her stage name Rise, was a Japanese singer of Korean descent. She was a member of the South Korean girl group Ladies' Code under Polaris Entertainment. Prior to her joining Ladies' Code, she participated in Miss Korea 2009 and was crowned as "Miss Korea Japan Jin". She was one of the Top 12 contestants of MBC's Star Audition The Great Birth.
She died in a car crash at age 23.

Biography
Kwon was born in Japan and was a fourth-generation Korean Japanese. She attended Fukushima , Tokyo Korean School and completed her university education at Seikei University, majoring in Economics and Business Administration. Before joining Ladies' Code, Kwon was also active as a model and previously participated in Miss Korea 2009 as the Japan representative. She signed with KeyEast after Star Audition The Great Birth in 2011.

In 2011, Kwon appeared in the third season of MBC's reality show We Got Married, where she was paired up with former Birth of a Great Star contestant, David Oh. She also filmed a LG commercial for LG Optimus 3D with David Oh in the same year.

In 2013, Kwon's contract with KeyEast expired and she went on to sign a contract with Polaris Entertainment as she wished to pursue a music career.

Music career

2013–2014: Music debut with Ladies' Code

On February 24, 2013, a teaser for Kwon was released on Polaris Entertainment's official YouTube channel. After a series of video teasers of the members of Ladies' Code, the music video for their debut was released on March 6, 2013. Their debut EP, Code#1 Bad Girl was released on March 7, 2013, through online music stores and the group performed on M Countdown on the same day.

On September 1, 2013, Ladies' Code released the video teaser for their second EP's title song, Pretty Pretty. The music video for the title track was released on September 3, 2013, and the EP, Code#02 Pretty Pretty, was released on September 5, 2013. On February 13, 2014, the official music video for their first single, So Wonderful was released and the group performed the new song for the first time on M! Countdown on February 13.

On August 6, 2014, the music video for Ladies' Code second single, Kiss Kiss was released on Loen Music's official YouTube channel and the single was released on August 7, 2014.

Death

After attending the recording of KBS "Open Concert" at DGIST and thus completing promotions for "Kiss Kiss",  the group was returning to Seoul when at approximately 1:30am on September 3, 2014 (KST), Kwon was critically injured in a car crash. Rainy conditions made the road slippery, which caused Park to suddenly lose control of the vehicle, causing the group's van to hydroplane and skid several times before crashing into a protective wall in the vicinity of the Singal Junction on Yeongdong Expressway.

It was reported that none of the van's airbags deployed at the time of impact. By the time the paramedics arrived at the scene, Kwon's injuries were so severe that the paramedics were unable to identify her. Her bandmates Ashley and Zuny sustained minor injuries while bandmate Sojung sustained major injuries, and EunB was killed. Park and one stylist sustained minor injuries.

Kwon was immediately taken to the Catholic University of Korea St. Vincent's Hospital, where she was given emergency CPR before being taken into surgery due to suffering severe cranial and abdominal injuries. The surgeons operated on her cranial area three times while also having to resuscitate her via defibrillation during the procedures. In the midst of a fourth procedure for her back in the 11th hour of surgery, Kwon's blood pressure began to drop very rapidly, making it unsafe to continue. She was moved to the intensive care unit at Ajou University Hospital, where she remained in critical condition. It was reported that her brain was severely swollen and that she was not regaining consciousness, with the doctors closely monitoring her condition in order to safely resume surgery.

Kwon died at 10:10 am (KST) on September 7, 2014, in Ajou University Hospital, having never woken up from her coma. Her wake was held at Korea University Anam Hospital funeral home. Her funeral in South Korea was held at Seoul Memorial Park on September 9, 2014. Many prominent South Korean stars attended her funeral or sent flower wreaths including her former Birth of a Great Star mentor Lee Eun-Mi, members of Super Junior, idol Roh Ji-hoon, Shinee, Kara, Bestie, Secret and more.

After the funeral, Kwon was cremated and her ashes were taken back to Japan, where another funeral was held for her family and close friends.

Discography

Soundtrack appearances

Filmography

Television

References

External links

1991 births
2014 deaths
People from Fukushima, Fukushima
Musicians from Fukushima Prefecture
Korean-language singers of Japan
Japanese female dancers
Japanese K-pop singers
Japanese dance music singers
Japanese television personalities
South Korean female idols
Japanese female models
Japanese people of South Korean descent
Miss Korea delegates
Ladies' Code
Road incident deaths in South Korea
Japanese women pop singers
Seikei University alumni